Mashhad County is in Razavi Khorasan province, Iran. The capital of the county is the city of Mashhad. At the 2006 census, the county's population was 2,848,637, in 746,652 households. The following census in 2011 counted 3,069,941 people in 889,034 households, by which time Torqabeh District had been separated from the county to form Torqabeh and Shandiz County. At the 2016 census, Mashhad County's population was 3,372,660, in 1,021,068 households. It is the most populous county in the province and the second most populous in the country, behind Tehran County.

Administrative divisions

The population history and structural changes of Mashhad County's administrative divisions over three consecutive censuses are shown in the following table. The latest census shows three districts, 11 rural districts, and four cities.

References

 

Counties of Razavi Khorasan Province